Gevar, also rendered as Givr, may refer to:

 Gevar-e Olya, Iran
 Gevar-e Sofla, Iran
 Gevar Rural District, Iran
 Yüksekova, Turkey

Gevar (Danish)
 Gevar is a Danish king in book III of the Gesta Danorum

See also